was a professional Go player.

Biography 
Born in Miyazaki, Japan in 1920, Sugiuchi became a professional in 1941. By 1959, he had reached 9 dan. His nickname was "the God of Go" (Japanese 碁の神様, Go no Kami-sama) because of his serious style and strait-laced personality. In December 2004, he became the oldest Nihon Ki-in professional to reach 800 career wins. He was married to Kazuko Sugiuchi (née Honda), one of three professional go-playing sisters.

Sugiuchi died in Tokyo on November 21, 2017 at the age of 97.

Runners-up

References

External links
Masao Sugiuchi's page at Nihon Ki-in website

1920 births
2017 deaths
Japanese Go players
People from Miyazaki Prefecture